Chris Haslam may refer to:
Chris Haslam (basketball) (born 1974), British former basketball player
Chris Haslam (skateboarder) (born 1980), Canadian skateboarder